Below are the rosters for teams competed in the original attempt 2022 World Junior Ice Hockey Championships.  The IIHF allowed rosters to be changed, and overage players were grandfathered for the rescheduled tournament in August 2022.

Group A

Head coach:  Marco Pewal

Head coach:  Dave Cameron

Head coach:  Karel Mlejnek

Head coach:  Antti Pennanen

Head coach:  Tobias Abstreiter

Group B

Head coach:  Sergei Zubov

Head coach:  Ivan Feneš

Head coach:  Tomas Montén

Head coach:  Marco Bayer

Head coach:  Nate Leaman

References

External links
WM20 - International Ice Hockey Federation
Roster Information & History - Elite Prospects
 IIHF World Juniors 2022

Rosters
World Junior Ice Hockey Championships rosters